Neocymbopteryx is a genus of moths of the family Crambidae. It contains only one species, Neocymbopteryx heitzmani, which is found in North America, where it has been recorded from Arkansas.

References

Natural History Museum Lepidoptera genus database

Odontiinae
Taxa named by Eugene G. Munroe
Crambidae genera
Monotypic moth genera